Derby is a city in Lucas County, Iowa, United States. The population was 90 at the time of the 2020 census.

History
Derby was platted in 1872.

Geography
Derby is located at  (40.930972, -93.456913).

Demographics

2010 census
As of the census of 2010, there were 115 people, 47 households, and 31 families living in the city. The racial makeup of the city was 99.1% White and 0.9% from two or more races.

There were 47 households, of which 31.9% had children under the age of 18 living with them, 53.2% were married couples living together, 8.5% had a female householder with no husband present, 4.3% had a male householder with no wife present, and 34.0% were non-families. 25.5% of all households were made up of individuals, and 10.7% had someone living alone who was 65 years of age or older. The average household size was 2.45 and the average family size was 2.97.

The median age in the city was 41.5 years. 24.3% of residents were under the age of 18; 3.6% were between the ages of 18 and 24; 25.2% were from 25 to 44; 31.3% were from 45 to 64; and 15.7% were 65 years of age or older. The gender makeup of the city was 51.3% male and 48.7% female.

2000 census
As of the census of 2000, there were 131 people, 53 households, and 34 families living in the city. The racial makeup of the city was 100.00% White.

There were 53 households, out of which 20.8% had children under the age of 18 living with them, 45.3% were married couples living together, 13.2% had a female householder with no husband present, and 35.8% were non-families. 34.0% of all households were made up of individuals, and 18.9% had someone living alone who was 65 years of age or older. The average household size was 2.47 and the average family size was 3.21.

In the city, the population was spread out, with 26.0% under the age of 18, 6.1% from 18 to 24, 26.0% from 25 to 44, 22.1% from 45 to 64, and 19.8% who were 65 years of age or older. The median age was 39 years. For every 100 females, there were 111.3 males. For every 100 females age 18 and over, there were 110.9 males.

The median income for a household in the city was $26,667, and the median income for a family was $31,250. Males had a median income of $23,333 versus $14,500 for females. The per capita income for the city was $10,605. There were 6.1% of families and 4.5% of the population living below the poverty line, including no under eighteens and 9.5% of those over 64.

Education
Mormon Trail Community School District operates schools serving the community.

Notable person
Lester J. Dickinson, U.S. Representative from Iowa's 10th district and U.S. Senator from Iowa was born in Derby.

References

Cities in Iowa
Cities in Lucas County, Iowa